John Russo may refer to:

 John Russo (baseball) (born 1973), American college baseball coach
 John A. Russo (born 1939), American screenwriter and film director
 John F. Russo (1933–2017), former American Democratic Party politician from New Jersey
 John A. Russo (politician) (born 1959), American city manager in the state of California